Piotr Bukowski (born 10 March 1963) is a German water polo player. He competed at the 1992 Summer Olympics and the 1996 Summer Olympics.

References

1963 births
Living people
German male water polo players
Olympic water polo players of Germany
Water polo players at the 1992 Summer Olympics
Water polo players at the 1996 Summer Olympics
Sportspeople from Gorzów Wielkopolski